Guadalupe Nuevo (Spanish: New Guadalupe) is one of the 33 barangays of Makati, Philippines, and belongs to its second legislative district. It is surrounded by EDSA and the Pasig River to the north, barangay Pitogo and Pinagkaisahan to the south, Cembo and South Cembo to the east, and barangay Guadalupe Viejo to the west. The Guadalupe MRT station is located along the barangay's boundary with Guadalupe Viejo. Various terminals of jeepney routes are also located in this barangay, thus the area is a transport hub. The old headquarters of Metropolitan Manila Development Authority is found in this barangay.

References 

Makati
Barangays of Metro Manila
Poblacion